Luyi County is a county of eastern Henan, People's Republic of China, bordering Anhui province to the east. It is under the administration of Zhoukou City. 

The county is known for its make-up brushes production, with over 150 million brushes produced annually. This industry started concentrating in Luyi in the 2010s, the county already had a wool processing industry before.

According to Sima Qian's Records of the Grand Historian, the village of Quren (Qūrén lǐ) in Li township (Lì xiāng) in Chu's Ku County (Kǔ xiàn) was the birthplace of the legendary philosopher Laozi. This lies within what is now Luyi. During the Song dynasty the Taiqing Palace was built in Luyi, an important Taoist shrine. Although it only exists as ruins nowadays, it remains an important religious and archeological site.

According to some historians, the Battle of Gaixia took place in what is now Luyi County.

Administrative divisions
As 2012, this county is divided to 9 towns and 13 townships.
Towns

Townships

Climate

References

County-level divisions of Henan
Zhoukou